The Canton of Armentières is a canton of the Nord département in France.

Since the French canton reorganisation which came into effect in March 2015, the communes of the canton of Armentières are:
 Armentières (chief town)
 Bois-Grenier 
 Capinghem 
 La Chapelle-d'Armentières 
 Deûlémont 
 Erquinghem-Lys 
 Frelinghien 
 Houplines 
 Pérenchies 
 Prémesques 
 Warneton

References

Armentieres